Tommaso de Franchi (1626–1696) was a Roman Catholic prelate who served as Bishop of Melfi e Rapolla (1671–1696).

Biography
Tommaso de Franchi was born in Genoa, Italy in 1626.
On 24 August 1671, he was appointed during the papacy of Pope Clement X as Bishop of Melfi e Rapolla.
On 6 September 1671, he was consecrated bishop by Federico Borromeo (iuniore), Cardinal-Priest of Sant'Agostino, with Giacomo Altoviti, Titular Patriarch of Antioch, and Giacomo de Angelis, Archbishop Emeritus of Urbino, serving as co-consecrators. 
He served as Bishop of Melfi e Rapolla until his death in May 1696.

While bishop, he was the principal co-consecrator of Marcos de Ostos, Archbishop of Salerno (1692); and Teofilo Testa, Bishop of Tropea (1692).

References

External links and additional sources
 (for Chronology of Bishops) 
 (for Chronology of Bishops) 

17th-century Italian Roman Catholic bishops
Bishops appointed by Pope Clement X
1626 births
1696 deaths